All Three Media Ghar is a Nepali private media production company located in Kathmandu and operated by TV journalists Sunil Koirala, Ananda Poudel, and Shiva Shrestha. It majorly produces programmes and documentaries in English, Nepali and other regional languages of Nepal. It started as a media production company in 2013.
It is a service oriented media house, established with the objective to promote and provide full-service communication development including branding product/services, strategies, development, and production of research-based IEC/BCC materials.

Television programs
 Surakshit Samudaya
 Nagar Bikash
 Baliyo Ghar

Newspapers
 Paryatan Abhiyan

Online
 Paryatan News

Production team
 Executive producer: Sunil Koirala
 Visual editor: Sanam Shrestha
 Program producer: Shiva Shrestha
 Program coordinator: Ananda Poudel
 Associate Producer: Mimraj Pandeya
 Camera person: Ratnamani Dahal
 Marketing representative: Naresh Adhikari

References

 About
 All Three Media Ghar Pvt. Ltd.

2013 establishments in Nepal
Film production companies of Nepal
Mass media companies established in 2013